Kenya Pipeline Company (KPC) is a state corporation that has the responsibility of transporting, storing and delivering petroleum products to the consumers of Kenya by its pipeline system and oil depot network.

Overview 
The Kenya Pipeline Company was incorporated on 6 September 1973 and started commercial operations in 1978. The company is a state corporation under the Ministry of Energy with 100% government shareholding.

Kenya Pipeline Company operates a pipeline system for transportation of refined petroleum products from Mombasa to Nairobi and western Kenya towns of Nakuru, Kisumu and Eldoret. Working closely with the National Oil Corporation of Kenya, KPC operates 5 storage and distribution depots for conventional petroleum products, located in Eldoret, Kisumu, Mombasa, Nairobi and Nakuru. Depots are fed by domestic-manufactured product from the Kenya Petroleum Refinery near Nairobi and imported, refined petroleum product from the Kipevu Oil Storage Facility near Mombasa. The company operates two aviation fuel depots at Jomo Kenyatta Airport, Nairobi, and Moi International Airport, Mombasa

In collaboration with the Government, KPC facilitates the implementation of Government policies:
 Acts as a Government agent in specific projects as directed through the Ministry of Energy.  To this end, the company works with the government in the implementation of key projects such as the extension of the Oil Pipeline to Uganda and the LPG import handling and storage facilities. 
 Assists in the fight against fuel adulteration and dumping. 
 Ensures efficient operation of petroleum sub-sector.

Unlike some state corporations, KPC does not depend on government subsidies, but is a source of revenue to the government in terms of dividends and taxes. It is supported by major petroleum companies which are signatories to the network, including Dalbit Petroleum.

In 2011, the government of newly independent South Sudan expressed interest to building a pipeline connecting the oil fields in that country to the existing South-Eldoret-Mombasa pipeline in Kenya.

In 2016, it was announced that KPC has secured $350 million to install a new 865-kilometers long pipeline from Mombasa to Nairobi. KPC is the largest consumer of electricity in Kenya.

Accidents
 2011 Kenya pipeline fire

Corruption scandal
On 7 December 2018, Joe Sang, the CEO of the Kenya Pipeline Company (KPC), was arrested with four other senior officials in connection with the loss of an unspecified amount of money during the construction of an oil jetty in the western city of Kisumu.

See also
 Upstream oil industry
 Downstream oil industry

References

External links
 Kenya Pipeline Corporation, official page

Oil companies of Kenya
Oil pipeline companies
Transport in Kenya
Government-owned companies of Kenya
Companies based in Nairobi
Kenyan companies established in 1977
Energy companies established in 1977